Progressive Heritage: The Evolution of a Politically Radical Literary Tradition in Canada is a 2002 book written by James Doyle.

References

2002 non-fiction books
Books about Canada